Umaswati, also spelled as Umasvati and known as Umaswami, was an Indian scholar, possibly between 2nd-century and 5th-century CE, known for his foundational writings on Jainism. He authored the Jain text Tattvartha Sutra (literally '"All That Is", also called Tattvarthadhigama Sutra). Umaswati's work was the first Sanskrit language text on Jain philosophy, and is the earliest extant comprehensive Jain philosophy text accepted as authoritative by all four Jain traditions. His text has the same importance in Jainism as Vedanta Sutras and Yogasutras have in Hinduism.

Umaswati is claimed by both the Digambara and Śvētāmbara sects of Jainism as their own. On the basis of his genealogy, he was also called Nagaravachka. Umaswati was influential not only in Jainism, but also other Indian traditions over the centuries. The 13th- to 14th-century Madhvacharya, founder of Dvaita Vedanta school of Hindu philosophy, for example referred to Umaswati in his works as Umasvati-Vachakacharya. Some in the Digambara Jain tradition believe him to be the chief disciple of Acharya Kundakunda. However, this is disputed by some Western scholars.

Umaswati, was an Acharya (head of the monastic order, teacher) and therefore one of the Pañca-Parameṣṭhi (five supreme beings) in Jaina tradition. The theory mooted by Umaswati is that rebirth and suffering is on account of one's karma (deeds)  and a life lived in accordance to vows of virtuous living with austerities cleanses this karma, ultimately leading to liberation. The main philosophy in Umaswati's Tatvartha Sutra aphorisms is that "all life, both human and non-human, is sacred."

Biography
Umaswati was born in Nyagrodhika village. His father was Svati and his mother was Uma. Umaswati was thus called as Svatitanaya after his father's name and as Vatsisuta after his mother's lineage. His name is a combination of the names of his parents. Umaswati is also known as Vacaka-sramana and Nagaravacaka. Digambara call him Umasvamin.

According to Vidyabhusana's book published in 1920, Umaswati died in 85 CE. More recent scholarship, such as by Padmanabh Jaini on the other hand, places him later, likely in the 2nd-century. Modern scholars such as Walter Slaje state that there are disagreements in dating Umaswati, and even whether Umaswati and Umaswami were two different persons, who lived sometime between 2nd- to 5th-century CE. Paul Dundas agrees that Tattvartha Sutra is among the oldest surviving Jaina philosophy text along with Bhagavati Sutra and the older Rsibhasitani, but dates Umaswati and the text to the 4th- to 5th-century.

Umaswati authored his scriptural work the Tattvartha Sutra when he was in Pataliputra or Kusumapura (now known as Patna, Bihar). He was the first Jain thinker to have written a philosophical work in the sutra style.

Umaswati, along with Kundakunda, is one of the two revered ancient scholars of Jainism. In Digambara tradition that reveres Kundakunda, Umaswati is considered as a disciple of Kundakunda. However, they differ in two ways. One, Kundakunda wrote in Prakrit, while Umaswati used Sanskrit. Second, their doctrines differ in the details, such as those about anekantavada. Neither mentions the other in his writings, and scholars have debated if there was any link between the two, and who preceded the other.

Philosophy

Umaswati in his Tattvartha Sutra, an aphoristic sutra text in Sanskrit language, enunciates the complete Jain philosophy. He includes the doctrines on the subjects of non-violence or ahimsa, Anekantavada (simultaneous existence and non-existence of something), and non-possession. The text, states Jaini, summarizes "religious, ethical and philosophical" themes of Jainism in the second century India. The Sūtras or verses have found ready acceptance with all the sects of Jainas, and on which bhasya (reviews and commentaries) have been written. Umaswati states that these beliefs are essential to achieving moksha or emancipation.

His sutra have been variously translated. The first verse of Tattvartha Sutra has been translated as follows:

Seven categories of truth

The core theology of Umaswati in Tattvartha Sutra presents seven categories of truth in sutra 1.4:
Souls exist (Jīva)
Non-sentient matter exists (ajiva)
Karmic particles exist that inflow to each soul (asrava)
Karmic particles bind to the soul which transmigrate with rebirth (bandha)
Karmic particles inflow can be stopped (samvara)
Karmic particles can fall away from soul (nirjara)
Complete release of karmic particles leads to liberation from worldly bondage (moksha)

Umaswati categorizes the types of knowledge to be empirical, attained through one's sense of perception; articulation that which is acquired through literature; clairvoyance is perception of things outside the natural reach of senses; mind reading; and omniscience. In chapter 2, Umaswati presents sutras on soul. He asserts that soul is distinguished by suppression of deluding karma, or elimination of eight types of karmas, or partial presence of destructive karmas, or arising of eight types of new karmas, or those that are innate to the soul, or a combination of these. In chapter 3 through 6, Umaswati presents sutras for his first three categories of truth.

Ethics
In chapter 7, Umaswati presents the Jaina vows and explains their value in stopping karmic particle inflow to the soul. The vows, translates Nathmal Tatia, are ahimsa (abstinence from violence), anirta (abstinence from falsehood), asteya (abstinence from stealing), brahmacharya (abstinence from carnality), and aparigraha (abstinence from possessiveness).

Karma and rebirths

Umaswati, in chapter 8 of Tattvartha Sutra presents his sutras on how karma affects rebirths. He asserts that accumulated karma in life determine the length of life and realm of rebirth for each soul in each of four states – infernal beings, plants and animals, human beings and as gods. Further, states Umaswati, karma also affects the body, the shape, the characteristics as well as the status of the soul within the same species, such as Ucchi (upper) or Nicchi (lower) status. The accumulated and new karma are material particles, states Umaswati, which stick to the soul and these travel with the soul from one life to the next as bondage, where each ripens. Once ripened, the karmic particles fall off, states Umaswati.

Shedding karma and liberation
The chapter 9 of Tattvartha Sutra by Umaswati describe how karmic particles can be stopped from attaching to the soul and how these can be shed. He asserts that gupti (curbing activity), dharma (virtues such as forbearance, modesty, purity, truthfulness, self-restraint, austerity, renunciation), contemplation, endurance in hardship (he lists twenty two hardships including hunger, thirst, cold, heat, nakedness, injury, lack of gain, illness, praise, disrespect), and with good character towards others (he lists five – equanimity, reinitiation, non-injury (ahimsa), slight passion and fair conduct), a soul stops karmic accumulations. External austerities such as fasting, reduced diet and isolated habitation, while internal austerities such as expiation, reverence, service, renunciation and meditation, according to Umaswati, along with respectful service to teachers and ailing ascetics help shed karma.

The state of liberation is presented in Chapter 10 by Umaswati. It is achieved when deluding and obstructive karmas have been destroyed. This leads to the state of quietism and potentiality, and the soul then moves to the end of the universe, states Umaswati.

Works
The Tattvartha Sutra has been the most important work of Umaswati. However, this text exists in at least two overlapping versions. The Svetambara version and the Digambara versions differ, for example, in sutras 1.33 and 1.34, with the Svetambara version listing five nayas and the Digambara version listing seven.

Along with Tattvartha Sutra, he also wrote Prasamarati, a guide for the aspirant on the path of peace and liberation from karmic bondage.

Reception
Umaswati was an influential, authoritative scholar in Indian history, particularly within Jainism. His Tattvartha Sutra has been a key and the oldest surviving text in Jainism, was accepted and widely studied in all four Jaina traditions (Svetambara, Digambara, Sthanakvasi and Terapantha). His Tattvartha Sutra, also called Dasasutri, was commented on by numerous Jaina scholars in the centuries that followed, for instance the 8th or 10th century Digambar acharya Vidyananda.

Umaswati's text Tattvartha Sutra was composed in Sanskrit, making it, according to Johnson, the earliest extant Sanskrit language literature related to Jainism. His text was cherished not only by the Jaina traditions, but widely distributed and preserved by the Hindus for centuries. The Hindu theistic scholar Madhvacharya praised Umaswati's ideas in the 13th-century, calling him Umasvati Vachakacharya (literally "expressive teacher"), as Madhvacharya developed his sub-school of dualism.

See also 

 Samantabhadra
 Bhadrabahu

Notes

References

External links 
 Umaswati in Epigraphical and Literary Tradition
 Digambar Jain Online
 Selections From Acharya Umaswami’s Tattvaarth Sutra

Jain acharyas
2nd-century Indian writers
Year of birth missing
Year of death missing
Indian Jain monks
2nd-century Indian Jains
2nd-century Jain monks
2nd-century Indian monks
Indian male writers